Jean-Charles Driant (1922–1989) was a French-born character actor remembered for numerous supporting roles in British film and TV.

Life
He was born in Paris, France on 12 July 1922.

He came to England in or before 1947. In the 1970s he was teaching French at Latymer Upper School.

He died in Kensington in 1989.

Family

In 1947 he married Joan Fulton in Kensington.

Film
The Colditz Story (1955) as French orderly
House of Secrets aka Triple Deception (1956) as Gratz's assistant
The Whole Truth (1958) as servant
The Ugly Duckling (1959) as Monsieur Blum
Return from the Ashes (1965) as train conductor
Soft Beds, Hard Battles (1974) as Jean
Aces High (1976) as corporal at dressing station

TV
Douglas Fairbanks Presents aka Rheingold Theatre several appearances from 1953 to 1957
Glencannon (1959) as photographer
No Hiding Place (1960) as French clerk
International Detective (1960) as bartender
Zero One (1962) as Pierre
Drama 61-67 (1964) as a waiter
A Man of Our Times (1968) as hotel proprietor
The Troubleshooters 1970 as a gendarme
The Persuaders! several episodes 1971
Doctor in Charge several appearances 1972/73 as Dr Lascelles
Mission: Monte Carlo (1974) 
Wings (1978) as a mechanic
Return of the Saint several appearances 1978/79

References

1922 births
1989 deaths
Male actors from Paris
French emigrants to the United Kingdom